Antonio Pavanello (born 13 October 1982 in Agordo) is an Italian former rugby union player. His preferred position was in the Second Row although he can also played equally well in the back-row. He played for Benetton Treviso in the Pro14 competition and the European Heineken Cup. 
From 2015 Pavanello is named Director of Rugby for Benetton Treviso.

Club career
He began his career playing since youth level for Rugby Rovigo, making his first appearance in the Italian first division in 2002, aged 19. After five seasons at Rovigo, in 2005 he then transferred to Benetton Treviso, the main club of nearby city Treviso. Starting from the 2009–10 season, he was also made club captain in place of Benjamin De Jager; Pavanello has consequently held the honour of being both the last captain of Treviso competing in the Italian first division (2009–10) and leading his team into their first ever match for the Celtic League tournament (2010–11), a home game in which they defeated the Scarlets.

National team
While playing for youth and senior teams of Rugby Rovigo, he made a good enough impression to be selected for Italy at Under 19, Under 21 and 'A' levels.
During his time in Treviso he has been capped five times by the Italy national rugby union team until 2007, playing 11 minutes against Argentina and 29 minutes against Australia in 2005. He gained his third cap against Argentina in 2007 playing 6 minutes as a replacement.
Pavanello was then basically dropped from the Italian main team for the whole tenure of Nick Mallett as head-coach (2007–11): though formally in the list of players eligible for taking the pitch in the 2010 Six Nations Championship, he only played in three test matches. Despite good efforts with the Italian 'A' team at the 2011 Churchill Cup, he was not selected for the 2011 Rugby World Cup in New Zealand; his drop caused some criticism  since the Italian team had poorly performed at line-out at the 2011 Six Nations Championship, whereas Treviso second-row led by Pavanello had proved consistent in this specific fundamental during the same season, but only fellow second-row teammate Corniel van Zyl was selected for the World Cup.
In the wake of the 2012 Six Nations Championship, under newly installed head-coach Jacques Brunel, Pavanello regained his place in the national team. In the tournament, he had to skip the first game against France due to ban, before taking the pitch against England and Ireland; in the latter game, he suffered an injury which prevented him from finishing the tournament.

Personal life
Pavanello gained a master's degree in Architecture from Iuav University of Venice in October 2008. He is married with a daughter born in 2011.

References

External links
Benetton Treviso Profile

1982 births
Italian rugby union players
Living people
Rugby union locks
People from Rovigo
Italy international rugby union players
Benetton Rugby players
Sportspeople from the Province of Rovigo